The Ziegler School of Rabbinic Studies, informally known as the "Ziegler School" or simply "Ziegler", is the graduate program of study, leading to ordination as a Conservative rabbi at the American Jewish University (formerly known as the University of Judaism).

Founded in 1996, it was the first independent rabbinical school located on the U.S. West Coast. It ordained its first class in 1999.

Located in Los Angeles, it has ordained about 100 rabbis, about half of them women. The school attracts an international student body, with students from Australia, Brazil, Canada, France, Israel, Mexico, Uganda, and the United Kingdom, as well as from every region of the United States. Upon ordination, Ziegler rabbis serve in every sector of the United States and Israel. Ziegler rabbis are automatically admitted to the international Rabbinical Assembly.

The Ziegler School program requires students to participate in a year abroad in Israel.

Notable faculty 
Bradley Shavit Artson
Aryeh Cohen
Elliot N. Dorff
Ziony Zevit

References

External links

American Jewish University
Jewish seminaries
Seminaries and theological colleges in California
Conservative Judaism in California
Educational institutions established in 1996
1996 establishments in California
Conservative yeshivas
Bel Air, Los Angeles